Judicial review in India is a process by which the Supreme Court and the High Courts of India review executive or legislative actions. They may invalidate amendments, laws, acts and governmental actions that are incompatible with the terms of the Constitution of India.  

Judicial review is one of the checks and balances in the separation of powers: the power of the judiciary to supervise the legislative and executive branches when the latter exceed their authority. The courts invalidate laws, acts and governmental (executive) actions which violate constitutional provisions. The courts can invalidate any constitutional amendments if they infringe on the basic structure of the Indian Constitution. 

Frequently, this power is used to the protect and enforce the fundamental rights guaranteed in the Constitution. To a lesser extent, judicial review is used in matters concerning legislative competence with regard to the centre-state relations.

The Constitutional Provisions 
The provisions in Constitution of India related to the Judicial Review: 

 Article 13
 Article 32: enshrines the Right to Constitutional Remedies.
 Article 131 to 134: provides the Supreme Court with the original jurisdiction for centre-state and inter-state conflicts, constitutional, civil and criminal cases.
 Article 135: authorises the Supreme Court to exercise the jurisdiction and powers of the federal court under any pre-constitution law
 Article 136: deals with Special Leave to Appeal in India.
 Article 143
 Article 226 to 227: authorises the high courts with the power of judicial review.
 Article 245 to 246
 Article 251 and Article 254: deals with situations where there is a dispute between the central and state laws. 
 Article 372: deals with pre-constitutional laws.

References

Law of India